Indandione may refer to:

 1,2-Indandione
 1,3-Indandione

Diketones
Indanes